In the Middle High German (MHG) period (1050–1350) the courtly romance, written in rhyming couplets, was the dominant narrative genre in the literature of the noble courts, and the romances of Hartmann von Aue, Gottfried von Strassburg and Wolfram von Eschenbach, written , are recognized as classics.

The  courtly romance has its origins in French-speaking courts around 1160, where various poets adapted the Matter of Rome (tales from the classical world) to the written vernacular, while Chrétien de Troyes did the same for the Matter of Britain (King Arthur and the knights of the Round Table). Chrétien, in particular, had a decisive influence on the development of the genre in German.

The earliest German romance is Heinrich von Veldeke's Eneas, based on the anonymous Old French Roman d'Enéas, part of the Matter of Rome, itself an adaptation of Virgil's Aeneid. As Gottfried von Strassburg put it, Veldeke "made the first graft on the tree of German" (Tristan, l. 4738f).

However, the main sources for MHG romances were four of Chrétien's Arthurian works: Erec et Enide, Lancelot ou le Chevalier de la charrette, Perceval ou le conte du Graal and Yvain. Three of the most significant and influential MHG romances had Chrétien as the main or sole source: Hartmann von Aue's  Erec (the first Arthurian romance in German), his later Iwein, and Wolfram von Eschenbach's Parzival. A fourth, Gottfried von Strassburg's  Tristan, was based on the Tristan romance of the Anglo-Norman Thomas of Britain. 

These MHG versions are not simple translations but involve "paraphrase, commentary, expansion, abbreviation, criticism, and re-shaping of the original."

In the classic Arthurian romance, a central issue is the relationship, and often conflict, between a knight's roles as both a warrior and a suitor or husband: knights must prove their worth through a series of unanticipated and challenging encounters (aventiure, literally "adventure"), and gain (or regain) the love of their chosen lady (minne, "love").  In contrast to the heroic epic, the romance depicts single combat rather than battles between armies, and women assume a more active role in relationships, no longer just the object of the knight's affections.

Later 13th-century authors expanded the range of narrative settings and were tied less closely to Old French originals, though they continued to draw on them, as well as on Hartmann, Wolfram and Gottfried, for themes and motifs. By the mid 14th century, however, changes in audience and patronage meant that for 100 years no new romances were written, until a revival in the 15th century.

Key authors and works

Eilhart von Oberge, Tristrant
Gottfried von Strassburg, Tristan (unfinished)
Hartmann von Aue,
Erec
Iwein
Heinrich von dem Türlin, Diu Crône
Heinrich von Veldeke, Eneit
 Konrad Fleck, Flore und Blanscheflur
Konrad von Stoffeln, Gauriel von Muntabel
Konrad von Würzburg,
 Der guote Gêrhart
 Engelhard
 Partnopier und Meliur
 Der Pleier,
Garel von dem blühenden Tal
Tandarios und Flordibel
Meleranz

 Rudolf von Ems, Willehalm von Orlens
Der Stricker, Daniel von dem Blühenden Tal
Ulrich von Zatzikhoven, Lanzelet
 Wirnt von Grafenberg, Wigalois
Wolfram von Eschenbach,
Parzival
Willehalm (unfinished)
Titurel (unfinished)
Unknown authors
Lohengrin
Prosa-Lancelot
Trierer Floyris (fragment)
Continuations
 Albrecht von Scharfenberg, Der jüngere Titurel
 Heinrich von Freiberg, Tristan
 Ulrich von Türheim, Tristan

Notes

Sources

 

 

 

 

Literary genres
Romance (genre)